Lewis Zahm, sometimes spelled Louis Zahm, was a Union Army colonel during the American Civil War.

Early life 
Lewis Zahm was born on August 7, 1820 in Zweibrücken, Bavaria. He moved to New York in 1836 and then on to Ohio.

American Civil War 

Zahm organized the 3rd Ohio Cavalry and was appointed colonel on September 27, 1861. He served as a brigade commander from September 9, 1862 to October 24, 1862 in the Army of the Ohio and from November 5, 1862 to January 5, 1863 in the Army of the Cumberland. He resigned from the volunteers on January 5, 1863.

On March 15, 1867, President Andrew Johnson nominated Zahm for appointment to the grade of brevet brigadier general of volunteers, to rank from March 13, 1865, and the United States Senate confirmed the appointment on March 26, 1867.

Later life  

After his service in the Civil War Zahm was an assessor for the Internal Revenue Service. He moved to Kansas in 1874 and became a stockman. Lewis Zahm died on December 10, 1890 in Seneca, Kansas. He is buried in Seneca Cemetery, Seneca Kansas.

See also

List of American Civil War brevet generals (Union)

References

Union Army colonels
People of Ohio in the American Civil War